Circaea × skvortsovii is a hybrid of flowering plants in the evening primrose family Onagraceae. The parents of the hybrid are Circaea cordata and Circaea canadensis subsp. quadrisulcata.

References

skvortsovii
Plant nothospecies